Alan Kemp Warren (born 13 December 1935) is a British sailor. He won a silver medal in the Tempest class with David Hunt at the 1972 Summer Olympics.

References

External links
 
 
 

1935 births
Living people
British male sailors (sport)
Olympic sailors of Great Britain
Olympic silver medallists for Great Britain
Olympic medalists in sailing
Sailors at the 1972 Summer Olympics – Tempest
Sailors at the 1976 Summer Olympics – Tempest
Medalists at the 1972 Summer Olympics